The following is a list of United States incorporated places with at least 5,000 workers with the 25 highest rates of pedestrian commuting (walking to work) (pedestrian mode share), according to data from the 2019 American Community Survey, 5 year average. The Census Bureau, through the American Community Survey, measured the percentage of commuters who walk to work, as opposed to bicycling, taking public transit, driving an automobile, boat, or some other means.  

1. Ithaca, New York 36.12%

2. State College, Pennsylvania 33.77%

3. Athens, Ohio 32.12%

4. North Chicago, Illinois 28.75%

5. West Lafayette, Indiana 24.74%

6. Cambridge, Massachusetts 24.24%

7. Oneonta, New York 22.56%

8. Oxford, Ohio 22.56%

9. Burlington, Vermont 22.21%

10. Columbia, South Carolina 21.86%

11. Pullman, Washington 20.94%

12. Bremerton, Washington 19.56%

13. College Park, Maryland 19.33%

14. Meadville, Pennsylvania 19.27%

15. Moscow, Idaho 18.91%

16. East Lansing, Michigan 18.76%

17. Atlantic City, New Jersey 18.55%

18. Indiana, Pennsylvania 18.22%

19. Whitewater, Wisconsin 17.27%

20. Morgantown, West Virginia 17.23%

21. Ellensburg, Washington 17.16%

22. Twentynine Palms, California 16.88%

23. Arcata, California 16.56%

24. Berkeley, California 16.54%

25. Ann Arbor, Michigan 16.52%

See also
List of U.S. cities with most bicycle commuters
List of U.S. cities with high transit ridership

References

Cities with most pedestrian commuters
Transportation in the United States
Pedestrian commuters
Walking in the United States